Dinarolacerta is a genus of wall lizards of the family Lacertidae.

Species
Dinarolacerta montenegrina  - Prokletije rock lizard
Dinarolacerta mosorensis  - Mosor rock lizard

References

 
Lizard genera
Taxa named by Edwin Nicholas Arnold
Taxa named by Oscar J. Arribas
Taxa named by Salvador Carranza